The Verdict is a 1946 American film noir mystery drama directed by Don Siegel and written by Peter Milne, loosely based on Israel Zangwill's 1892 novel The Big Bow Mystery. It stars Sydney Greenstreet and Peter Lorre in one of their nine film pairings, as well as Joan Lorring and George Coulouris.  The Verdict was Siegel's first full-length feature film.

Plot
George Edward Grodman, a respected superintendent at Scotland Yard in 1890, makes a mistake in an investigation that causes the execution of an innocent man. He takes the blame for his error, is dismissed from his position as superintendent and replaced by the obnoxious and gloating John Buckley.

Soured by the turn of events, Grodman sets out to make Buckley look too inept to perform his new job. He enlists the aid of his macabre artist friend, Victor Emmric, and when a mysterious murder occurs, they realize their chance to ruin Buckley may have arrived.

Cast
 Sydney Greenstreet as Superintendent George Grodman
 Peter Lorre as Victor Emmric
 Joan Lorring as Lottie Rawson
 George Coulouris as Superintendent John R. Buckley
 Rosalind Ivan as Mrs. Vicky Benson
 Paul Cavanagh as Clive Russell
 Arthur Shields as Reverend Holbrook
 Morton Lowry as Arthur Kendall
 Holmes Herbert as Sir William Dawson
 Clyde Cook as Barney Cole
 John Goldsworthy as Chaplain

Reception
Bosley Crowther in The New York Times was unimpressed; "It is rather hard to figure just what the Warners saw in this antique mystery story other than roles for Sydney Greenstreet and Peter Lorre. But even those are of slight consequence. ...Neither gentleman approaches his assignment with apparent satisfaction or zest. Mr. Greenstreet is puffier than usual, and Mr. Lorre more disinterested and wan. In the end, after various turns and skirmishes uninspiredly aimed to baffle and disturb, they both seem entirely willing to call quits." Variety wrote, "Stock mystery tale with period background, The Verdict aims at generating suspense and thrills, succeeding modestly."

See also
 The Crime Doctor (1934)

References

External links
 
 
 
 

1946 films
1946 crime drama films
1946 directorial debut films
1940s historical films
American crime drama films
American historical films
American black-and-white films
Film noir
Films about capital punishment
Films scored by Friedrich Hollaender
Films set in London
Films set in 1890
Films directed by Don Siegel
Films based on British novels
Warner Bros. films
1940s English-language films
1940s American films